The 2011 ITU Sprint Distance Triathlon World Championships was a triathlon race organised by the International Triathlon Union (ITU) held in Lausanne, Switzerland on August 20. Along with the ITU Team Triathlon World Championships, being held the following day in Lausanne, points earned at the Sprint Distance Championship are incorporated into the 2011 World Championships Series rankings.

The event hosted both elite-level and amateur triathletes. The race is composed of a 750 m swim, 20 km cycle, and 5 km run. A prize purse of $100,000 was awarded for the sprint event. This race marked one of the final races before the 2011 ITU World Championship Grand Final in Beijing, making the points earned at the race crucial.

Results

Men

Women

References

External links
Lausanne event website

Sprint
2011 in Swiss sport
Triathlon competitions in Switzerland
International sports competitions hosted by Switzerland